Sofia is a village in Drochia District, Moldova. At the 2004 census, the commune had 4,823 inhabitants.

Notable people
 Lidia Istrati (1941–1997)
 Iulian Filip (born 1948)

References

Villages of Drochia District
Bălți County (Romania)